

Endemism and threats
The islands are home to several endemic genera.

Endemic Bird Area
Birdlife International defines Endemic Bird Areas (EBAs) as places where the breeding ranges of two or more range-restricted species—those with breeding ranges of less than —overlap. In order to qualify, the whole of the breeding range of at least two range-restricted species must fall entirely within the EBA. The entire Galápagos Islands archipelago is considered to be an Endemic Bird Area. Ten Important Bird Areas, which are areas which meet a specific set of internationally agreed criteria, fall within the EBA's boundaries.

List of endemic species

Notes

Citations

References

 
 
 
 
 
 
 
 
 

'
Galápagos Islands